Chow Ken (秋瑾) is a 1972 Hong Kong film.

References

See also
Qiu Jin

1972 films
Hong Kong martial arts films
1970s action films
1970s Mandarin-language films
Films directed by Ting Shan-hsi
1970s Hong Kong films